Indian Creek is a  tributary of the Youghiogheny River in Fayette County, Pennsylvania in the United States.

Indian Creek drains the west slope of Laurel Hill in the Laurel Highlands and cuts a steep side canyon into the Youghiogheny Gorge to join the Youghiogheny River between Ohiopyle and Connellsville.

See also
List of rivers of Pennsylvania

References

Rivers of Pennsylvania
Tributaries of the Youghiogheny River
Rivers of Fayette County, Pennsylvania